Tamás or Tamaș, the Hungarian word for "Thomas" and a common surname, can refer to:
 Barnabás Tamás (1952), Hungarian politician
 Gabriel Tamaș (1983), Romanian professional footballer 
 Gáspár Miklós Tamás (1948), Hungarian marxist-anarcho-syndicalist philosopher and public intellectual
 János Tamás (1936–1995), Hungarian-Swiss composer, conductor and music educator
 Krisztián Tamás (1995), Hungarian professional footballer 
 László Tamás (1988), Romanian football player of Hungarian descent 
 Márk Tamás (1993), Hungarian professional footballer
 Nándor Tamás (2000), Romanian professional footballer of Hungarian ethnicity
 Olivér Tamás (2001), Hungarian professional footballer 

Hungarian-language surnames
Surnames from given names